Admiral Ross may refer to:

Charles Ross (Royal Navy officer) (1776–1849), British Royal Navy vice admiral
Erik M. Ross (born 1965), U.S. Navy rear admiral
George Campbell Ross (1900–1993), British Royal Navy rear admiral
John Ross (Royal Navy officer) (1777–1856), British Royal Navy rear admiral
Philip H. Ross (1905–1981), U.S. Navy rear admiral
William J. Ross (Star Trek), fictional Starfleet vice admiral in the TV series, Star Trek: Deep Space Nine

See also
Worth G. Ross (1854–1916), U.S. Revenue Cutter Service captain-commandant (equivalent rank before use of the admiral rank in the U.S.)